This is a list of foreign players in the Nemzeti Bajnokság I, which commenced play in 1901. The following players:
have played at least one Nemzeti Bajnokság I game for the respective club. Players who were signed by Nemzeti Bajnokság I clubs, but only played in lower league, cup and/or European games, or did not play in any competitive games at all, are not included.
have not been capped for the Hungary national team on any level.
have been born in Hungary and were capped by a foreign national team. This includes players who have dual citizenship with Hungary.

Albania
 Berat Ahmeti  – Újpest – 2014
 Jasir Asani - Kisvárda - 2021-
 Albion Avdijaj - Debrecen - 2018-19
Naser Aliji – Honvéd – 2019–21
Amir Bilali - Mezőkövesd - 2022
 Sulejman Demollari – Győr – 1996–97
 Albi Doka - Honvéd - 2022-
 Eros Grezda - Zalaegerszeg - 2021-22
Liridon Latifi – Puskás Akadémia – 2017–19
 Kristi Marku – Honvéd – 2014–15
 Hysen Memolla - Diósgyőr - 2020-21
 Herdi Prenga - Kisvárda, Honvéd - 2021-
 Kamer Qaka - Mezőkövesd - 2022-
 Ylber Ramadani - MTK - 2021-22
 Erjon Rizvanolli - Tatabánya - 2005-06
 Odise Roshi - Diósgyőr - 2021
 Myrto Uzuni - Ferencváros - 2020-22

Algeria
 Karim Benounes  – Vasas – 2010–11
 Nacer Bouiche  – Ferencváros – 1990–91; 1993–94
 Fouad Bouguerra  – Nyíregyháza, Győr – 2010–11
 Badis Lebbihi  – Kaposvár – 2014
 Meziane Touati  – Ferencváros, Honvéd – 1996–99

Angola 

 Evandro Brandão - Videoton - 2011-13

Argentina
 Carlos Auzqui - Ferencváros - 2022-
 Juan Briones - Győr - 2010-11
 Jeremías Buz - Diósgyőr - 2006-07
 Lucas Cariati - Újpest - 2006-07
 Edgardo Díaz - Kecskemét - 2013
 Luis Ibáñez - Győr - 2015
 Gastón Lodico - Ferencváros - 2020
 Carlos Marinelli - Győr - 2010-11
 Augusto Max - Diósgyőr - 2020-21
 Héctor Morales – Ferencváros – 2010–12
 Lucas Ontivero - Honvéd - 2015
 Matías Navarrete - Diósgyőr - 2007-09
 Matías Porcari - Honvéd - 2012
Matías Rodríguez – Ferencvárosi – 2018–19
Ivan Zaleh - Újpest, Nyíregyháza - 2007-09

Armenia 

 Abov Avetisyan - Kisvárda - 2020-
 Yeghia Yavruyan - Dunaferr, Sopron, Békéscsaba - 1998-99; 2001–04

Australia
Golgol Mebrahtu – Puskás Akadémia – 2019–20
Sasa Radulovic - Újpest - 2007-08
David Williams  – Haladás – 2016–18

Austria
 Ahmet Delić -  Zalaegerszeg - 2010-12
 Emir Dilaver – Ferencváros – 2014–17
 Marco Djuricin – Ferencváros – 2016-17
 Elvir Hadžić - Videoton - 2017-19
 Daniel Kogler - Siófok - 2009
 Rolf Landerl - Sopron - 2005-06
 Manuel Martic - Mezőkövesd - 2020-21
 Slobodan Mihajlović - MTK - 2019
 Richard Niederbacher - Pécs - 1994-95
 Milan Oraze - Honvéd - 2004-06
Thomas Piermayr – Békéscsaba – 2015–16
Attila Raba - Haladás - 1996
Philipp Schmiedl - Mezőkövesd - 2022
Michael Stanislaw – Eger – 2012–13
Peter Žulj - MOL Fehérvár - 2022

Barbados 

 Thierry Gale - Honvéd - 2020-22

Belarus 

 Alyaksandr Karnitsky - Mezőkövesd - 2019-
 Vladislav Klimovich - Gyirmót - 2022
 Oleg Korol - Ferencváros, Stadler, Gázszer - 1996-99
 Mikalay Signevich - Ferencváros - 2019-20
 Sergey Yasinsky - Stadler - 1997

Belgium
 Naïm Aarab – Újpest – 2012–14
 Stanley Aborah – Ferencváros – 2013-15
 Samy Bourard - MOL Fehérvár - 2021
 Yassine El Ghanassy - Újpest - 2021
 Kylian Hazard – Újpest – 2015–17
 Jonathan Heris – Újpest, Puskás Akadémia – 2014–20
 Roland Lamah – Ferencváros – 2014–16
 Simon Ligot – Újpest – 2013–14
 Pieter Mbemba – Kaposvár – 2014
Mohamed Mezghrani – Honvéd, Puskás Akadémia – 2019–
 Pierre-Yves Ngawa – Újpest – 2013–14
 Nikolas Proesmans – Újpest – 2012–14
 Kurt Vermeesch – Vasas – 1993–94
 Stef Wils – Haladás – 2015–18
 Thomas Wils – Haladás – 2015–16

Benin 

 Sidoine Oussou - Kecskemét - 2013

Bolivia 

 Vicente Arze - Diósgyőr - 2011-12

Bosnia and Herzegovina

 Sabahudin Agic - Nagykanizsa, Győr - 1994-96; 1999-00
 Eldin Adilović - Győr - 2010
 Muhamed Bešić – Ferencváros – 2012–14; 2021-
 Dino Beširović - Mezőkövesd - 2020-
 Mario Božić - Videoton, Újpest - 2004-09
 Dženan Bureković - Újpest - 2018-20; 2022-
 Eldar Ćivić - Ferencváros - 2019-
 Danijel Ćulum - Kaposvár - 2010
 Josip Ćutuk - Újpest - 2008-09
 Jusuf Dajić – Videoton, Vasas, Siófok – 2006–08; 2011–14
 Ognjen Đelmić – Debrecen – 2016-17
 Andrija Drljo - MTK - 2020-22
 Almir Filipovic - BVSC, Nagykanizsa, Videoton, Siófok - 1993-95; 1996–97; 2003–04
 Amer Gojak - Ferencváros - 2022-
 Boris Gujić - Kaposvár - 2008-12
 Anel Hadžić – Videoton – 2016-20
 Emir Hadžić – Honvéd – 2012
 Emir Halilović - Zalaegerszeg - 2021-22
 Haris Handžić - Debrecen - 2017
Armin Hodžić – Fehérvár – 2018–22
Adnan Hrelja - Pécs - 2011-12
Senad Husić – Diósgyőr – 2013–16
Nikola Jokišić - Pécs - 2002-03
 Aleksandar Jovanović – Ferencváros – 2011–14
 Marin Jurina - Mezőkövesd - 2020-22
 Djordje Kamber – Diósgyőr, Zalaegerszeg, Győr, Honvéd – 2008–21
 Almin Kapic - Stadler - 1994-95
 Kenan Kodro - MOL Fehérvár - 2021-
 Adnan Kovačević - Ferencváros - 2020-
 Stjepan Lončar - Ferencváros - 2021-22
 Darko Ljubojević - Zalaegerszeg - 2001-06; 2006–07
 Vladimir Markovic - Pécs - 2012
 Haris Mehmedagić - Vasas - 2011-12
 Dalio Memić - Kecskemét - 2010
 Jasmin Mešanović - Kisvárda - 2021-
 Bojan Mihajlović – Újpest – 2011-14
 Emil Miljković - Ferencváros - 2010-11
 Romeo Mitrović - Kecskemét - 2008-10
 Stevo Nikolić – Debrecen – 2011–14
 Branko Ojdanić - Pécs - 2015
 Tomislav Stanić - Diósgyőr - 2006-07
 Miroslav Stevanović - Győr - 2014-15
 Jovica Stokić - Honvéd, Kecskemét - 2010-11; 2011–12
 Asmir Suljić, Újpest, Videoton, Diósgyőr – 2013–18; 2021
 Dusko Vranesevic - Diósgyőr - 2008-09

Brazil
Alef - MOL Fehérvár - 2020-
Adriano Alves – Ferencváros – 2010–11
André Alves – Honvéd, Kaposvár, Videoton, Mezőkövesd – 2005–08; 2009–12; 2018
Juliano Alves - Videoton - 1995-96
William Alves – Diósgyőr – 2013–15
Andrezinho – Ferencváros – 2010–12
Diego Balbinot - Nyíregyháza - 2010
Bruno Dos Santos Bosi - Vasas - 2010
Guilherme Brandelli -  Pápa - 2005-06
Diego Carioca - Zalaegerszeg - 2022-
Celso - Nyíregyháza - 2004-05
Nicolás Ceolin – Győr, Honvéd, Pécs - 2009–13
Charleston - Debrecen - 2021-
Coelho - Debrecen - 2004-05
Danilo – Honvéd – 2010–12; 2017–19
Leandro da Silva - Kaposvár - 2007-08
Mauro da Silva - Tatabánya - 1999-00
Alex De Paula - Pápa, Szolnok, 2009–11
Diego - Honvéd - 2006-10
Marcelo Dluzniewski - Vác - 2007
Edson - Videoton - 2012-14
Élder - Pápa - 2006
Eliomar - Kecskemét - 2013-14
Evandro - MOL Fehérvár - 2020-22
Fábio - Puskás Akadémia, Békéscsaba - 2013-16
Felipe – Kisvárda – 2018–20
Felipe Félix – Ferencváros – 2011
Júnior Fell - Ferencváros - 2013
Geovanni Fraga Fretta - Vác - 2007
Bernardo Frizoni – Diósgyőr, Pápa – 2011-12; 2014–15
Gerson - Ferencváros - 2013-14
Giba Gilberto - MTK - 1998-99
Fabrizio Goncalves - Tatabánya, Honvéd - 1999-02
Gugu - Siófok - 1997-98
Franciel Hengemühle - Debrecen - 2005
Isael – Ferencváros – 2019–21
Jerson - Siófok, Vasas, Tatabánya,2000; 2004–05; 2005–06
Jhonnes - Újpest - 2011
Ji-Paraná – Győr – 2010–12
Jorginho - Kecskemét - 2012-13
Jucemar - Újpest - 2008-10
Julinho - Videoton - 2001-02; 2006–07
Júnior – Kaposvár, Ferencváros – 2009–12
Kaká - Videoton - 2012-13
Fábio Kolling - Sopron - 2007
Leandro - Vác - 2007
Matheus Leoni - Kisvárda - 2021-
Maikel - Haladás - 2008-10
Marquinhos - Ferencváros - 2022-
Bruno Moraes – Újpest – 2012–13
Moreira - Honvéd - 2008-11
Myke - MTK, Haladás 2015-19; 2020–21
Renato Neto - Videoton - 2012
Nildo - Videoton - 2013-14
Fabio de Oliveira - Pápa - 2008
Marquinhos Pedroso - Ferencváros - 2017-18
Pedro Sass Petrazzi – Kaposvár – 2010–13
Anderson Pico – Kisvárda – 2018–20
Flávio Pim - Debrecen - 2003-05
Prado - Vác - 2007
Reginaldo Regis - Siófok - 1997-98
Thiago Ribeiro - Siófok, Dunaújváros - 2010-11; 2014–15
Robson - Kecskemét - 2008-10
Lucas Rocha - Kaposvár - 2013
César Romero - Videoton - 2008-09
Roni - Siófok - 2008-09; 2010–11
Sassá – Kisvárda – 2018–21
Alison Silva - Videoton, Ferencváros - 2009-11
Jeff Silva – Videoton, Diósgyőr – 2012-13
Somália – Ferencváros – 2012–15; 2020–22
Talys - Honvéd - 2021
Tanque - Eger - 2012-13
Tarabai - Kecskemét - 2012-13
Cristiano Thomas - Vác - 2007
Marco Túlio - Debrecen - 2007
Túlio – Újpest – 2002
Fernando Viana - Kisvárda, Újpest - 2020-22
Vinicius - Debrecen - 2008-10; 2012–13
Welton - MTK, Pápa, Nyíregyháza - 2003-06; 2007–08
Weslen Júnior - Puskás Akadémia - 2020-22

Bulgaria
 Preslav Borukov - Zalaegerszeg - 2021
 Ivo Georgiev - Debrecen, Honvéd - 1990–93; 2000–01
 Kamen Hadzhiev - Puskás Akadémia - 2019-21
Galin Ivanov – Haladás – 2019
Yanis Karabelyov - Kisvárda - 2021-
Georgi Korudzhiev – Sopron, Békéscsaba – 2006–07; 2015–16
Dimitar Makriev - Pécs - 2015
Georgi Milanov - MOL Fehérvár - 2018-20
Antonio Vutov - Mezőkövesd - 2020-22

Cameroon
 Mohamadou Abdouraman - Diósgyőr, Nyíregyháza - 2011-15
 Arouna Baba - Diósgyőr - 2007-08
 Steve Bessong - Diósgyőr - 2007-08
 Makadji Boukar - Vasas - 2011-12
 Petrus Boumal - Újpest - 2022-
 Dani Chigou - Debrecen - 2008
 Fabrice Deffo - Sopron - 2007-08
 Dennis Dourandi - Újpest - 2007-08
 Christian Ebala - Diósgyőr, Újpest, Kecskemét - 2007-08; 2010–12; 2013–14
 Georges Ekounda - Siófok - 2009
 Etogo Essama - Debrecen - 2010
 Eugene Fomumbod - Győr, Siófok - 2008-12
 Douva Halidou - Diósgyőr - 2006-08
 Justice Jessy - Vasas - 1994-96
 Thomas Job – Honvéd – 2013-14
 Papson Kanga Joseph - Diósgyőr - 2007
 Dorge Kouemaha - Tatabánya, Debrecen - 2005-08
 Yves Mboussi - Nyíregyháza - 2007-10
 Justin Mengolo – Debrecen – 2017–18
 George Menougong - Nyíregyháza, Diósgyőr, Mezőkövesd - 2007-08; 2009–10; 2011–12; 2013-14
 Patrick Mevoungou - Győr, Mezőkövesd, Diósgyőr, Puskás Akadémia, Kisvárda - 2013-14; 2016–19
 Edouard Ndjodo - Tatabánya, Honvéd, Siófok - 2005-09
 Michel Ndoumbé - Újpest - 1995-96
 Yannick Ndzoumou - Diósgyőr - 2019
 Joseph Ngalle - Tatabánya, Szolnok - 2005-07; 2010–11
MacDonald Niba – Honvéd – 2019-20
Ismaila Ousman - Diósgyőr - 2019
Njongo Priso - Győr - 2015
Effeyie Stephane Roger - Diósgyőr - 2008
Haman Sadjo - Diósgyőr, Újpest, Honvéd - 2006-08; 2009–11
 Hervé Tchami – Szolnok, Honvéd – 2010–13
 Joël Tchami - Eger - 2012-13
 Abdoulaye Yahaya - Újpest - 2021-22
 Mbengono Yannick – Honvéd, Kecskemét, Debrecen, Pápa – 2005–06; 2008–13; 2015
 Eric Zambo - Honvéd - 2006

Canada 
 Stefan Cebara - Zalaegerszeg - 2010-11
 Richie Ennin - Honvéd - 2022-
 Manjrekar James – Pécs, Diósgyőr, Vasas – 2014–18
 Franco Lalli - Pápa - 2006
 Joevannie Peart - Pápa - 2006
 Igor Pisanjuk – Ferencváros, Szolnok, Eger – 2009–11; 2012–13
 Dave Simpson - Pápa - 2005-06

Cape Verde
 Stopira – Videoton – 2012-
 Zé Luís - Videoton - 2013-14

Central African Republic 

 Foxi Kéthévoama - Diósgyőr, Újpest, Kecskemét - 2006-12
 Wilfrid Oueifio - Kaposvár - 2008

Colombia
 Darwin Andrade - Újpest - 2014
 José Cortés - Diósgyőr - 2020-21
 Sebastián Herrera - MTK - 2020-22
 Edixon Perea – Honvéd – 2013–14
 César Quintero – Pápa – 2010–15

Congo
 Francis Litsingi – Újpest, Kecskemét – 2008-13
 Jean-Claude Mbemba – Vasas – 1990–96
 Jean-Pierre Zabundu - Siófok- 1999-00

Congo DR
Kadima Kabangu – Honvéd – 2016–18
Rosy Lubaki - Újpest - 2018-20
Christy Manzinga - Zalaegerszeg - 2022-
Moto Adede Moke - Vasas - 1995-96
Landry Mulemo – Kaposvár – 2014
 Bavon Tshibuabua – Újpest – 2012-14

Costa Rica 

 Mayron George - Honvéd - 2020

Croatia
 Stjepan Babić - Kaposvár - 2013-14
 Valentin Babić - Győr - 2009-12
 Stipe Bacelic-Grgic – Puskás Akadémia, Mezőkövesd – 2015–18
 Ante Batarelo - Haladás, Balmazújváros - 2015-16; 2017–18
 Roko Baturina - Ferencváros - 2020-
 Alen Bjelic - Ferencváros - 1998-99
 Boris Bjelkanović - Honvéd - 2011-12
 Marko Brtan - Mezőkövesd - 2022-
 Marijan Čabraja - Ferencváros - 2021-22
 Luka Capan - Honvéd - 2022-
 Andrej Čaušić – Pécs – 2011–13; 2014–15
 Niko Datković - Kisvárda - 2020-21
 Marko Dinjar - Győr, Puskás Akadémia, Mezőkövesd - 2009-17
 Luka Dominić - Kaposvár - 2013-14
 Josip Elez - Honvéd - 2015
 Igor Gal - Diósgyőr - 2009-10; 2011–13
 Dino Gavrić - Dunaújváros - 2014-15
 Dejan Godar - Szeged - 1999-00
 Alen Grgić - Diósgyőr - 2021
 Mato Grgić – MTK Budapest – 2015-17
 Šime Gržan - Zalaegerszeg - 2022-
 Ronald Habi - Debrecen, Újpest, Siófok - 2003-09
 Tomislav Havojic – Ferencváros – 2014–15
 Ivan Herceg - Puskás Akadémia - 2015-16
 Ivor Horvat - Puskás Akadémia - 2017
 Marko Iharos - Budafok - 2020-21
 Frane Ikić - Gyirmót - 2021-22
 Hrvoje Jančetić - Győr - 2003-04
 Karlo Kamenar - Mezőkövesd - 2021
 Marko Kartelo - Győr - 2001-05
 Matija Katanec - Mezőkövesd, Zalaegerszeg - 2018-22
 Renato Kelić - Puskás Akadémia - 2014-16
 Tomislav Kiš - Mezőkövesd - 2022-
 Josip Knežević - Puskás Akadémia - 2017-21
 Dominik Kovačić - Kisvárda - 2022-
 Robert Kovacic - Zalaegerszeg - 1996-97
 Tonći Kukoč – Honvéd, Kisvárda – 2018–20
Stjepan Kukuruzović – Ferencváros – 2014–15
Tomislav Labudović - Honvéd - 2011
Tino Lagator - Pápa - 2013
Zoran Lesjak - Zalaegerszeg - 2019-
Ivan Lovrić - Kecskemét, Honvéd, 2008–09; 2010-
Andrej Lukić - Mezőkövesd - 2022-
Davor Magoč - Honvéd - 2008-09
Marko Malenica - Diósgyőr - 2021
 Antonio Mance - Puskás Akadémia - 2020-21
 Mirko Marić - Videoton - 2017
 Luka Marin - Diósgyőr - 2021
 Marin Matoš - Újpest - 2010-11
 Tomislav Mazalović - Diósgyőr - 2018-19
 Haris Mehmedagić – Vasas – 2011
 Damir Milanovic - Videoton - 2009-11
 Goran Milović - Diósgyőr - 2021-
Benedik Mioč – Puskás Akadémia – 2018–19
Matija Mišić - Kisvárda - 2018-19
Frano Mlinar - Mezőkövesd - 2017-18
Marijan Nikolić - Nyíregyháza, Pápa - 2004-06
Vedran Nikšić - Győr - 2011
Stjepan Oštrek - Zalaegerszeg - 2020
Antun Palić - Kaposvár - 2020
 Goran Paracki – Pécs – 2012
 Milan Pavličić - Videoton - 2008-09
 Mateo Pavlović – Ferencváros – 2014–15
 Goran Perak - Kecskemét - 2009-10
 Darko Perić - Győr, Zalaegerszeg - 2002-06
 Marko Perković - MTK - 2021-22
 Antonio Perošević - Puskás Akadémia, Újpest - 2017-18; 2019–21
 Jurica Pranjić - Vasas - 2011-12
 Miljenko Pribisalic - Békéscsaba - 2004-05
 Jakov Puljić - Puskás Akadémia - 2021-
 Anto Radeljic - Gyirmót - 2017
 Ivan Radoš - Diósgyőr - 2009-19
 Božidar Radošević - Debrecen - 2015-16
 Besnik Ramadani - Zalaegerszeg - 2007-08
 Mihael Rebernik - Zalaegerszeg - 2022
 Danijel Romić - Pécs, Vasas, Budafok - 2013-16; 2020–21
 Nikola Šafarić - Kaposvár - 2011-13
 Dajan Šimac - Debrecen - 2010-13
Marko Šimić – Vasas, Ferencváros – 2011–12
Zankarlo Simunic - Békéscsaba - 2003-05
 Dino Škvorc – Honvéd – 2018–19
 Vinko Soldo - Diósgyőr - 2021
 Josip Špoljarić - Zalaegerszeg - 2021-22
 Mario Tadejević - Pécs - 2015
 Sandro Tomić - Debrecen, Honvéd - 2002-07
 Dinko Trebotić - Videoton, Kaposvár - 2014-16; 2020
 Aljoša Vojnović – Kaposvár – 2019-20
Bojan Vručina – Kaposvár – 2012–14
Lovre Vulin - Zalaegerszeg - 2007-08
Ivor Weitzer - Pécs - 2015
Diego Živulić - Diósgyőr - 2021

Curaçao
 Quenten Martinus - Ferencváros - 2013
 Prince Rajcomar – Zalaegerszeg – 2009-11
 Gino van Kessel - Gyirmót - 2022

Cyprus 

 Fanos Katelaris - Zalaegerszeg - 2020

Czech Republic
 Vít Beneš - Vasas, Haladás - 2017-18
 Denis Granečný - Mezőkövesd - 2022
 Josef Hamouz - Eger - 2012-13
 Jaroslav Hauzner - Videoton, Siófok - 1992-94
 Marek Heinz – Ferencváros – 2010-11
 Jiří Kabele - Eger - 2012-13
 Martin Klein – Ferencváros – 2011-13
 Petr Knakal - Eger - 2012-13
 Libor Kozák - Puskás Akadémia - 2021-22
 Jiří Krejčí – Pécs – 2012-13
 Michael Lüftner - MOL Fehérvár - 2021-22
 Jaroslav Navrátil - Kisvárda - 2020-
 Jan Nečas – Tatabánya – 2006-07
Tomáš Pilík – Honvéd – 2018
Jakub Plšek - Puskás Akadémia - 2020-
Michael Rabušic - Haladás - 2018-19
Miroslav Rada - Vasas - 2004-05
Michal Šilhavý - Honvéd - 2004-05
Jan Šimůnek - Vasas - 2017-18
 Marek Střeštík – Győr, MTK, Mezőkövesd – 2012-18
 Patrizio Stronati - Puskás Akadémia - 2021-
 Michal Švec – Győr – 2012-15
 Robert Vágner - Újpest, Ferencváros - 2001-02; 2004–05
David Vaněček – Puskás Akadémia, Diósgyőr – 2019-21
 Jan Vosahlik – Mezőkövesd – 2016-17
 Lukáš Zelenka – Honvéd - 2011-12

Denmark 

 Kenneth Christiansen - Ferencváros - 1994-95
 Kasper Larsen - MOL Fehérvár - 2022-
 Rajko Lekić - Zalaegerszeg - 2007
 Emil Lyng - Haladás - 2018-19
 Rasmus Thelander - Ferencváros - 2022-

Ecuador
Augusto Batioja - Diósgyőr - 2013-14
Bryan de Jesús – Puskás Akadémia – 2018
Cristian Ramírez – Ferencváros – 2015-17

Egypt 

 Sherif Sadek - Zalaegerszeg - 2011

El Salvador
 Arturo Alvarez – Videoton – 2013–15
 Rafael Burgos – Kecskemét, Győr – 2012-14

England
James Ashmore – Ferencváros – 2009-10
Anthony Elding – Ferencváros – 2010
Nathan Eccleston – Békéscsaba – 2016
Nikon El Maestro - Újpest - 2012
 Matthew Lowton – Ferencváros – 2009
 Scott Malone - Újpest - 2009
 Gary Martin - Újpest - 2010
 Brandon Ormonde-Ottewill - Puskás Akadémia - 2022-
 Rohan Ricketts - Diósgyőr - 2010
 Paul Shaw – Ferencváros – 2009-10
 Sam Stockley – Ferencváros – 2010–11
 Tony Stokes - Újpest - 2009-10
 Sam Wedgbury – Ferencváros – 2009
 James Weir - MTK - 2021-22

Estonia
 Jarmo Ahjupera – Győr, Újpest – 2009-14
 Martin Hurt - Nyíregyháza - 2010
 Tarmo Kink – Győr, Kaposvár, Mezőkövesd – 2008-10; 2012–14; 2016–17
 Märten Kuusk - Újpest - 2022-
 Igor Morozov - Debrecen - 2013-15
 Artur Pikk - Diósgyőr - 2021
 Sander Puri - Pápa - 2011
 Vjatšeslav Zahovaiko - Debrecen - 2011-12

Finland
 Nikolai Alho - MTK - 2021-22
 Juha Hakola – Ferencváros – 2011-13
 Antonio Inutile - Pápa - 2012
 Aristote M'Boma - Újpest - 2014
 Paulus Roiha - Újpest - 2007-08

France

 Nacim Abdelali - Nyíregyháza - 2009-10
 Selim Bouadla - Debrecen - 2011-15
 Slimane Bouadla - Debrecen - 2012-14
 Joël Cantona – Újpest – 1992-93
Grégory Christ – Újpest – 2012-14
 Adamo Coulibaly – Debrecen – 2009-13; 2015–16
 Yohan Croizet - Újpest - 2021-
 Joël Damahou - Debrecen - 2013-14
 Mamadou Danfa - Vasas - 2010
 Sylvain Deslandes - Debrecen - 2021-
Mahamadou Diawara - Zalaegerszeg - 2007-08
Brandon Domingues - Honvéd - 2022-
Lyes Houri - MOL Fehérvár - 2020-21; 2022-
Ismaël Koné - Eger - 2013
Yohann Lasimant - Eger - 2013
Zinédine Machach - Honvéd - 2021-22
Xavier Mercier - Ferencváros - 2022-
Péguy N'Gam - Diósgyőr - 2007-08
David N'Gog – Honvéd – 2018-20
Jean-Baptiste Paternotte - Haladás - 2010
Karim Rouani - Honvéd - 2010-11
 l´Imam Seydi – Diósgyőr, Debrecen, Nyíregyháza – 2011-15
 Gary Tavars - Honvéd - 2010-11
 Jimmy Jones Tchana - Debrecen, Sopron, Diósgyőr - 2007-09
 Mamadou Wagué - Puskás Akadémia - 2013

Gabon
 Arsène Copa - Győr - 2007-12
 Thierry Issiémou - Debrecen, Vasas - 2007-08
 Brice Mackaya - Vasas, Vác - 1994-96
 Roguy Méyé – Zalaegerszeg, Debrecen – 2007-09; 2011–12

Gambia
 Lamin Colley - Puskás Akadémia - 2022-
 Haruna Jammeh – Kaposvár – 2011-14
 Lamin Jallow - MOL Fehérvár - 2021-22

Georgia 
 Rati Aleksidze – Győr – 2009-13
Bachana Arabuli – Balmazújváros, Puskás Akadémia – 2017–19
Zurab Arziani - Nyíregyháza - 2015
Giorgi Beridze - Újpest - 2018-19; 2020–22
Kakhaber Chkhetiani - Debrecen, Pécs - 2001-03
 Dato Dartsimelia – Nyíregyháza – 2015
 Murtaz Daushvili – Diósgyőr, Haladás – 2016-17; 2018–19
 Lasha Dvali – Ferencváros – 2019-22
 Giorgi Ganugrava – Győr, Pápa, Zalaegerszeg – 2009-12
 Davit Imedashvili - Nyíregyháza - 2009
 Givi Ioseliani - Kecskemét - 2013
 Nodar Kavtaradze - Mezőkövesd - 2021
 Giorgi Kharaishvili - Ferencváros - 2021-
 Giorgi Kvilitaia - Győr - 2013-15
 Luka Lakvekheliani - Mezőkövesd - 2020-
 Irakli Maisuradze - Balmazújváros - 2017-18
 David Odikadze - Győr - 2009
 Vakhtang Pantskhava - Győr, Vasas - 2010-11
 Teimuraz Sharashenidze - Győr - 2010-11
 Lasha Shindagoridze - Balmazújváros - 2018
 Lasha Totadze – Győr, Pápa – 2010–12
 Budu Zivzivadze - Mezőkövesd, MOL Fehérvár, Újpest - 2019-

Germany
Yusuf-Muri Adewunmi – Honvéd – 2007-08
Philipp Bönig – Ferencváros – 2012-15
Pascal Borel – Honvéd – 2007–08
 Felix Burmeister – Vasas – 2016-18
 Marcel Heister - Ferencváros, MOL Fehérvár - 2018-
 Oliver Hüsing – Ferencváros – 2016-17
 Luis Jakobi - Újpest - 2022-
 Darius Kampa - Zalaegerszeg - 2006-07
 Julian Koch – Ferencváros - 2017-19
 Benjamin Lauth – Ferencváros – 2014-15
 Luca Mack - Újpest - 2021-
 Marko Marin - Ferencváros - 2021-22
Thomas Meißner – Puskás Akadémia – 2019–21
Christian Müller – Vasas – 2016
Reagy Ofosu – Haladás – 2018–19
 Janek Sternberg – Ferencváros - 2017-18
 Florian Trinks – Ferencváros – 2016-17
 Esad Veledar - Honvéd - 2008

Ghana 

 Aaron Addo Dankwah - Kaposvár, Újpest - 2012-15
 William Amamoo - Sopron - 2006-07
 Felix Ankamah - Sopron - 2006-07
 Ellis Samuel Ato - Kaposvár, Pécs - 2008-09; 2011–12
 Nasiru Banahene - MTK - 2019
 Abraham Frimpong - Ferencváros - 2018-21
 Bradley Hudson-Odoi - Vasas - 2011-12
 Mohammed Kadiri - Honvéd - 2022
 Emmanuel Mensah - Honvéd - 2014
 Clinton Osei - MTK - 2020-22
 Princeton Owusu-Ansah - Nyíregyháza - 2004
 Joseph Paintsil - Ferencváros - 2017-18
 Emeka Unaka - BVSC - 1994-95

Greece
 Vassilios Apostolopoulos – Puskás Akadémia – 2013
Thodoris Berios – Kisvárda FC – 2018-20
Konstantinos Dimitriou - Mezőkövesd - 2021
Lazaros Fotias - Kaposvár - 2013
Ilias Ignatidis - Vasas - 2016
Nikolaos Ioannidis - Diósgyőr - 2017-18
Panagiotis Kermanidis - MTK - 1971-73
Georgios Koutroumpis - Újpest - 2020-22
Alexandros Kyziridis - Debrecen - 2022-
Georgios Neofytidis - Debrecen - 2022-
Stavros Tsoukalas – Kisvárda – 2019-21
Nikos Vergos - Vasas - 2017-18

Grenada
 Kemon Thomas – MTK – 2004

Guadeloupe 

 Jean-Pierre Morgan - Honvéd - 2015

Guinea
Fousseni Bamba – Honvéd – 2018-19
Ousmane N'Gom Camara - Újpest - 1997
Moustapha Diallo – Kaposvár – 2011-13
Jean-Louis Keita - Újpest - 1997
Pato - Kecskemét - 2013-14
Alhassane Soumah - Videoton - 2015-16
Sylla - Haladás, Tatabánya - 1998-00
 Souleymane Youla – Honvéd – 2014-16

Guinea-Bissau
 Mamadu Candé - Videoton - 2013–14
 Saná Gomes - Debrecen - 2022-

Honduras
 Luis Ramos – Nyíregyháza, Debrecen, Kecskemét – 2008-13

Iceland
Aron Bjarnason - Újpest - 2019-21
Kjartan Finnbogason – Ferencváros – 2018–19
Viðar Ari Jónsson - Honvéd - 2022-

Iran
 Amir Hashemi – Vasas – 1990–91
 Nadir Mir Ahmadian - Vasas - 1991
 Shahab Zahedi - Puskás Akadémia - 2022-
 Mohamed Ziai - Vasas - 1990

Israel
Nir Bardea - Honvéd - 2021-22
Robi Levkovich – Honvéd – 2019-20
Maxim Plakuschenko - Honvéd - 2022-
Yadin Zaris – Újpest – 2012

Italy

 Raffaele Alcibiade – Honvéd, Haladás – 2013–16
 Emiliano Bonazzoli - Honvéd - 2014
 Giuseppe Borrello - Újpest - 2022-
 Gabriele Fabris - Kaposvár - 2010
 Christian Galliano - Sopron - 2007-08
 Federico Groppioni – MTK – 2010–17
 Davide Lanzafame – Honvéd, Ferencváros – 2013, 2016–20
Arturo Lupoli – Honvéd – 2014
 Andrea Mancini – Honvéd, Haladás – 2013–15
 Leandro Martínez – Honvéd, Győr, Haladás, MTK– 2013–17
Federico Moretti – Honvéd – 2019
Luca Pinton - Sopron - 2006-07
Riccardo Piscitelli - Mezőkövesd - 2021-
Tommaso Rocchi – Haladás – 2014-15
Luigi Sartor – Sopron – 2006
Nicola Silvestri – Sopron – 2005-06
 Giuseppe Signori – Sopron – 2005–06
Emanuele Testardi – Honvéd – 2013
Angelo Vaccaro - Honvéd - 2010

Ivory Coast
 Jean-Baptiste Akassou - Honvéd, Pécs - 2010-13
 Benjamin Angoua – Honvéd - 2005-10
 Franck Boli - Ferencváros - 2019-
 Souleymane Diaby – Honvéd – 2011–13
 Sindou Dosso – Nyíregyháza, Kecskemét – 2008–12
 Abraham Gneki Guié – Honvéd - 2006-10
 Fernand Gouré - Újpest - 2022-
 Georges Griffiths – Pápa, Diósgyőr – 2013-17
 Abdul Kader Keïta – Honvéd – 2014-15
 Mory Koné - Újpest - 2021-22
 Jean-Paul Nomel - Siófok - 2011
 Junior Tallo - Újpest - 2020-
 Kandia Traoré – Honvéd – 2014
 Lacina Traoré – Újpest – 2019

Jamaica
 Jason Morrison – Ferencváros – 2009–10
 Rafe Wolfe – Ferencváros, MTK, Győr – 2009-11; 2012–14

Japan
 Kazuo Homma – Pápa, Diósgyőr, Nyíregyháza, Siófok, Vasas – 2005-11

Kosovo
 Florent Hasani –  Diósgyőr, Gyirmót – 2018-22
 Lirim M. Kastrati - MOL Fehérvár - 2022-
 Lirim R. Kastrati - Újpest - 2020-
 Ilir Nallbani - Tatabánya - 2006

Latvia 

 Rolands Bulders - Stadler - 1996-97
 Aleksandrs Čekulajevs - Pápa - 2012-13
 Deniss Ivanovs - Nyíregyháza - 2015
 Vitālijs Jagodinskis - Diósgyőr - 2016-17
 Aleksandrs Jeļisejevs - Stadler - 1996
 Vitālijs Meļņičenko - Szolnok - 2011
 Artjoms Rudņevs - Zalaegerszeg - 2009-10
 Igors Tarasovs - Kaposvár - 2020
 Daniils Turkovs - Zalaegerszeg - 2011-12
 Mihails Zemļinskis - BVSC - 1994
 Vadims Žuļevs - Pápa - 2009-11; 2014–15

Liberia
 Joachim Adukor - Diósgyőr - 2019-20
 Victor Carr - Diósgyőr, Haladás - 2007; 2009
 Mle Collins - Tiszakécske - 1997-98
 George Gebro - Honvéd - 2008-09
 John Moses - Honvéd - 1996-97
 Frank Seator – Pécs, Videoton – 1995–97
 Philip Tarlue - Honvéd - 1996-98

Lithuania
 Vytautas Karvelis - Videoton - 1997-98
 Mindaugas Malinauskas - Diósgyőr, Debrecen - 2010-12
 Eimantas Marozas - Szolnok - 2010-11
 Linas Pilibaitis – Győr, Mezőkövesd – 2009–14
 Valdas Urbonas - Videoton, Gázszer - 1997-99
 Robertas Zalys - Zalaegerszeg - 1991-92

Mali
 Abdoulaye Diaby - Újpest - 2021-
 Mamadou Diakité – Honvéd – 2012–13
 Alassane Diallo - Újpest - 2017-19
 Ulysse Diallo - Ferencváros, Mezőkövesd, Puskás Akadémia, MTK - 2013-14; 2016–19; 2020–21
 Drissa Diarra – Honvéd – 2012–14
 Souleymane Diarra - Újpest - 2016-17
 Bakary Nimaga - Zalaegerszeg - 2021-22
 Abdou Tangara - Honvéd - 2005
 Adama Traoré  - Ferencváros - 2022-
 Boubacar Traoré - Honvéd - 2020-

Malta
 Justin Haber – Ferencváros – 2009–11
 Rowen Muscat - Dunaújváros - 2014
 André Schembri – Ferencváros – 2010–11

Martinique 

 Rémi Maréval - Videoton - 2015

Mexico
 Jesús Flores - Tatabánya - 2008
 David Izazola - Honvéd - 2015
 Kichi - Tatabánya - 2007-08
 Aquino Orlando - Sopron - 2007
 José Manuel Rivera - Honvéd - 2007

Moldova
 Serghei Alexeev – Kaposvár – 2011–12
 Valerij Capatina - Nyíregyháza - 1998
 Artur Crăciun - Honvéd - 2020-22

Mongolia
 Ganbayar Ganbold – Puskás Akadémia – 2020-

Montenegro
 Jovo Aranitović - Győr - 2003-04
 Jovan Baošić - Újpest - 2020-21
 Ivan Bojović - Zalaegerszeg - 2005-06
 Mijuško Bojović - Gyirmót, Újpest - 2016-19
 Bojan Božović - Békéscsaba, Honvéd, Kaposvár, Siófok - 2004-09; 2011–12
 Mladen Božović – Videoton – 2010–13
 Bojan Brnović - Debrecen, Győr, Diósgyőr - 2005-10
 Boris Bulajić - Kecskemét - 2013-14
 Driton Camaj - Kisvárda - 2020-
 Đorđije Ćetković - Győr - 2010
 Ivan Delić - Zalaegerszeg - 2011-12
 Stefan Denković - Puskás Akadémia - 2014-15
 Meldin Dreskovic - Debrecen - 2022-
 Uroš Đuranović - Kecskemét - 2022-
 Nenad Đurović - Szolnok - 2011
 Ivan Janjušević - Vasas - 2011
 Vlado Jeknić - Diósgyőr - 2009-10
 Darko Karadžić - Videoton - 2010
 Nebojša Kosović – Újpest – 2014
 Dušan Lagator - Debrecen - 2022-
 Igor Lambulić - Kaposvár - 2009-10
 Darko Marković - Újpest - 2011-12
 Milan Mijatović - MTK - 2020-22
 Darko Nikač – MTK Budapest – 2016–17
 Darko Pavićević – Zalaegerszeg, Kecskemét – 2009–12; 2014
 Vladan Pelicic - Kecskemét - 2009
 Mihailo Perović - Újpest - 2015-17
 Danijel Petković - MTK - 2016-17
 Vukašin Poleksić – Tatabánya, Debrecen, Kecskemét, Pécs, Békéscsaba, Vasas – 2005-10; 2012–17
 Milan Purović - Videoton - 2009
 Ilija Radović - Videoton - 2008-11
 Marko Radulovic - MTK - 2008-09
 Bojan Sanković – Újpest, Zalaegerszeg – 2013–
 Vladan Savić – Kecskemét – 2007–
 Marko Šćepanović - Pécs - 2011-12
 Radislav Sekulić - Honvéd - 2011
 Marko Simić - Honvéd - 2008-09
 Mićo Smiljanić - Diósgyőr, MTK, Honvéd - 1998-99; 2000–03; 2006–09
 Petar Stanišić - Nyíregyháza, Szolnok - 2010
 Pavle Velimirović - Kecskemét - 2008-10
 Marko Vidović – Honvéd, Eger – 2012-13; 2014–15
 Goran Vujović - Videoton, Kecskemét, Haladás, Eger - 2008-12
 Vladimir Vujović - Vasas - 2009
 Marko Vukasović - Kecskemét, Vasas - 2012-15

Morocco
 Chemcedine El Araichi - Győr - 2010
 Ayub - MTK - 2013-14
 Sofian Chakla - Videoton - 2014-15
 Daniane Jawad - Kaposvár - 2010-12
 Karim Loukili - Debrecen - 2022-
 Ryan Mmaee - Ferencváros - 2021-
 Samy Mmaee - Ferencváros - 2021-
 Youssef Sekour – Diósgyőr, Pápa – 2012-14

Mozambique
 Genito – Honvéd - 2004-09
 Patricio Madzina - Honvéd - 2005
 Mano-Mano – Honvéd - 2004-06
 Marito - Honvéd - 2005-06
 Miró – Honvéd - 2005-06

Netherlands
 Sjoerd Ars – Haladás – 2016-17
 Benito Belliot - Haladás - 1996
 Geoffrey Castillion – Debrecen, Puskás Akadémia - 2015-17
 Glenn Helder – MTK – 1999-00
 Julian Jenner – Ferencváros, Diósgyőr – 2012-15
 Mats Knoester - Ferencváros - 2022-
 Leonardo - Ferencváros - 2013-14
 Kees Luijckx - Videoton - 2015
 Kelvin Maynard - Kecskemét - 2011
 Mark Otten – Ferencváros – 2011-14
 Sjoerd Overgoor – Haladás – 2016–17
 Luciano Slagveer - Puskás Akadémia - 2020-
 Jos Smeets – Haladás – 1986
 Ferne Snoyl - Újpest - 2011
 Jack Tuijp - Ferencváros - 2013
 Arsenio Valpoort - Ferencváros - 2013-14
 Yoell van Nieff - Puskás Akadémia - 2019-

New Zealand
 Kris Bright – Honvéd - 2011

Niger
 Amadou Moutari – Ferencváros, Mezőkövesd, Honvéd, 2017–20

Nigeria
 Tunde Adeniji - Debrecen - 2019-20
 David Abwo - Pápa - 2010
 Funsho Bamgboye - Haladás, MOL Fehérvár - 2017-
 Fortune Bassey - Ferencváros - 2022
 Ismaila Bisoye - Újpest - 2007
 Kasali Yinka Casal - Vasas - 2011
 Anderson Esiti - Ferencváros - 2022-
 Emeka Ezeugo – Honvéd - 1994
 Babatunde Fatusi – Pécs, Ferencváros - 1995-96
Haruna Garba – Debrecen – 2019-20
Ezekiel Henty - Videoton, Puskás Akadémia - 2017-19
 Augustine Igbinadolor – Veszprém – 1989
 Harmony Ikande –Honvéd - 2011
 Patrick Ikenne-King – Honvéd, MTK, Mezőkövesd – 2012-22
 Henry Isaac - Siófok - 2011
 Austin Izediunor - Vác - 1995-96
Marshal Mfon Johnson – Honvéd – 2011-13
Akeem Latifu – Honvéd – 2017
Onyabor Monye - Újpest, Videoton - 1997-98; 2002–03
Obinna Nwobodo - Újpest - 2017-20
Henry Odia - Honvéd - 2012-13
Godian Ofoegbu - Nagykanizsa - 1999-00
 Kim Ojo – Újpest – 2014-15
 Kingsley Ogbodo - Újpest - 2007
 Derick Ogbu – Debrecen – 2016-17
 Solomon Okoronkwo – Pécs – 2012–13
 Peter Olawale - Debrecen - 2022-
 Dudu Omagbemi - Debrecen, Kecskemét - 2008-10
 Vincent Onovo - Újpest - 2018-
 Eugène Salami – Debrecen, Kecskemét – 2011-13
 Theophilus Solomon - Újpest - 2019
 Meshack Ubochioma - Zalaegerszeg - 2021-
 Patrick Umoh – Újpest, Csepel – 1983; 1985

North Macedonia 
 Kemal Alomerović - Zalaegerszeg - 2008-09
 Viktor Angelov – Újpest – 2016-18
 David Babunski - Debrecen, Mezőkövesd, 2021-
 Dorian Babunski - Debrecen - 2022-
 Aleksandar Bajevski – Győr, Siófok, Ferencváros – 2003–06
 Enis Bardhi – Újpest – 2014-17
 Vladica Brdarovski - Győr - 2015
 Dančo Celeski - Nyíregyháza - 1998-00
 Matej Cvetanoski - Gyirmót - 2022
 Aleksandar Damchevski - Mezőkövesd - 2017
 Gjorgji Hristov - Debrecen - 2005-06
 Simeon Hristov - Eger - 2012
 Mario Ilievski - Kisvárda - 2022-
 Mirko Ivanovski – Videoton, Diósgyőr – 2015–16; 2019–21
 Nikola Jakimovski – Ferencváros – 2010
 Stefan Jevtoski - Újpest - 2021-
 Jasmin Mecinovikj - Eger, Pápa - 2012-14
 Mirsad Mijadinoski - Újpest, Debrecen - 2008-11
 Daniel Milovanovikj - Zalaegerszeg - 2021-
 Bojan Miovski - MTK - 2020-22
 Visar Musliu - MOL Fehérvár - 2019-22
 Boban Nikolov - MOL Fehérvár - 2018-21
 Kire Ristevski – Vasas, Újpest – 2016-21
 Remzifaik Selmani - Újpest, Mezőkövesd - 2017-18; 2022-
 Nikola Serafimov - Zalaegerszeg, MOL Fehérvár - 2021-
 Stefan Spirovski - Ferencváros, MTK - 2017-19; 2022
 Aco Stojkov - Debrecen, Nyíregyháza - 2007-09

Northern Ireland
 Tommy Doherty – Ferencváros – 2010

Norway
 Liban Abdi – Ferencváros – 2009–12
 Tokmac Nguen – Ferencváros – 2019-
 Kristoffer Zachariassen - Ferencváros - 2021-

Pakistan
 Adnan Ahmed – Ferencváros – 2009–10

Palestine 

 Imad Zatara - Zalaegerszeg - 2008

Panama
 Azmahar Ariano - Honvéd - 2014
 Aníbal Godoy – Honvéd – 2013-15

Paraguay 

 Gonzalo Cardozo - Diósgyőr - 2008
 Óscar Velázquez - Vasas - 2010

Poland
 Lukas Klemenz - Honvéd - 2021-
 Rafał Makowski - Kisvárda - 2022-
 Michal Nalepa – Ferencváros – 2014-17
 Mariusz Unierzyski - Vasas - 2006-09
 Robert Warzycha - Pécs, Honvéd - 1994-96

Portugal
 Marco Caneira – Videoton – 2011–15
 Mauro Cerqueira - Újpest - 2020-21
 Tiago Ferreira – MTK – 2020–22
 Vítor Gomes - Videoton - 2013-14
 Jucie Lupeta - Videoton - 2013-14
 João Nunes - Puskás Akadémia - 2020-22
 Filipe Oliveira – Videoton – 2011–16
Rui Pedro – Ferencváros, Haladás, Diósgyőr, Mezőkövesd – 2017–21
Rúben Pinto - MOL Fehérvár - 2020-
André Portulez - Kaposvár - 2011
Hugo Seco - Kisvárda - 2019-20
Sandro Semedo - Zalaegerszeg - 2020-21

Romania
 András Ábrahám - Haladás - 1994
 Sebastian Achim – Gyirmót – 2016-17
 Lucian Anania – BVSC – 1993-94
 Bogdan Andone – Ferencváros – 2002–2003
 Alexandru Andraşi – Vác – 1995–2000
 Cătălin Anghel – BVSC – 1998-99
 Bogdan Apostu – Nyíregyháza, Diósgyőr – 2008-09
 Catalin Azoitei - Pécs, Csepel, Győr, Honvéd, Nyíregyháza, Nagykanizsa - 1993-00
 Danut Bába - BVSC - 1994
 Valeriu Balaci - Haladás - 2004
 Cristian Balaj – Pécs – 1992-93
 Dumitru Balea – Győr – 1997
 Dorel Balint – Honvéd – 2001–04
 Alexandru Băluță – Puskás Akadémia – 2020–
 Gheorghe Banica –  Tatabánya – 1991–92
 Florin Bătrânu – Honvéd – 2002
 István Berde - Győr - 2009-10
 Nelu Bessermann - Tiszakécske - 1997-98
 Ciprian Binder – Győr, Diósgyőr – 2004–07
 Béla Bíró - Győr, Gázszer, Videoton - 1990-91; 1994–95; 1999, 2001
 Imre Bíró – Győr – 1990–91
 Virgiliu Bocan – Stadler – 1998
 István Bódis - Balmazújváros - 2017
 Ion Bogdan – MTK – 1946–47
 Liviu Bonchis – Haladás, Zalaegerszeg – 1996-02
 Csaba Borbély - Haladás, Ferencváros - 1999-00; 2005
 Sorin Botiş – Ferencváros, Zalaegerszeg, Honvéd – 2003–12
 Laurențiu Brănescu – Haladás – 2015
 Aurel Brindas - Pécs - 1996-97
 Dan Bucșa – Győr – 2015
 Vlad Bujor – Zalaegerszeg – 2011
 Relu Buliga –  Debrecen, Diósgyőr – 1994; 1997–99
 Dionisiu Bumb – Pécs – 1995–96
 Claudiu Bumba – Kisvárda, MOL Fehérvár – 2019-
 Lucian Burchel – Nyíregyháza – 1993
 Andreias Calcan - Újpest, Mezőkövesd - 2020; 2021–22
 Florin Calin – Honvéd – 1998
 Cornel Casoltan – Zalaegerszeg, Debrecen – 1997-99
 Marius Cheregi – Videoton, Ferencváros – 2000–2002
 Petru Chiratcu – Győr, Sopron – 1991; 1993–95
 Cristian Cigan – Sopron – 2005–07
 Sorin Cigan – Szeged, Újpest, Ferencváros, Vasas, Stadler – 1991-94
 Marcel Cimpian - Tiszakécske - 1997 
 Mircea Ciocan - Békéscsaba - 1994
 Dan Colesniuc - Újpest - 1991 
 Dan Constantinescu - Honvéd - 2016
 Marius Corbu – Puskás Akadémia – 2020–
 Claudiu Cornaci – Nyíregyháza, Szolnok – 2007-10
 Constantin Cornel - Debrecen - 1999
 Andrei Coroian – Kaposvár, Pápa – 2013-14
 Alexandru Costisor - Sopron - 2005-06
 Alin Coțan – Sopron – 2005–06
 István Cseke - Honvéd, Győr - 1995-98
 Alexandru Darha - Videoton - 1994
 Ionut Daria - Sopron - 2006
 Ciprian Dianu – Diósgyőr, Zalaegerszeg – 2005; 2007
 Francisc Dican – Nyíregyháza – 1999–2000
 Mihai Dina – Győr – 2012
 Marian Dinu - Haladás - 1999
 Benone Dohot – Diósgyőr – 1992–93
 Ciprian Dorobantu – Pécs – 1994
 Alin Dragan – MTK – 2002–03
 Alexandru Dragomir - Sopron - 2007  
 Cristian Dulca – Honvéd – 2002
 Adrian Dulcea – Győr – 2001
 Gheorghe Dumitrașcu – Győr – 1996
 Cornel Ene – Kisvárda, Gyirmót – 2018-22
 Carlo Erdei - Balmazújváros - 2017-18
 Iuliu Farkaș – Ferencváros, Kolozsvár – 1943-44
 Ioan Filip – Debrecen – 2016-19
 Dragoș Firțulescu – Kaposvár – 2014
 Andrei Florean – Kaposvár, Pápa – 2014-15
 Danut Frunza – Diósgyőr, Újpest – 1999-00; 2001–02
 István Fülöp - Diósgyőr - 2017
 Lóránd Fülöp – Puskás Akadémia – 2019
 Romulus Gabor – Diósgyőr– 1991-92
 Alexandru Gaica - Debrecen - 1995
 Adrian Găman – Siófok – 2008
 Remus Ganea – Diósgyőr – 1999–00
 Attila Ghinda - Honvéd - 1995-96
 Cosmin Giura – Sopron – 2007-08
 Sabin-Cosmin Goia – Nyíregyháza, Pécs – 2008-09; 2011–12
 Liviu Goian – Debrecen – 1993-00
 Decebal Gradinariu – Nyíregyháza – 1998-99
 Gheorghe Grozav – Kisvárda, Diósgyőr, MTK - 2019-22
 Radu Gușatu – MTK – 2000
 Otto Hindrich - Kisvárda - 2022-
 Sergiu Homei – Sopron – 2006-07
 Răzvan Horj – Újpest – 2018-19
 Sebastian Ianc - Sopron - 2006
 Ion Ibric – Sopron – 2005-07
 Daniel Iftodi – Győr – 1995
 Nicolae Ilea – Debrecen, MTK, Videoton – 1994-00
 Sabin Ilie – Debrecen – 2003
 Radu Ion - Debrecen - 1993
 Andrei Ionescu – Ferencváros – 2012-14
 Lóránt Kovács – Haladás, Újpest – 2016-20
 Ilie Lazar – Győr – 1996; 1998–99
 Ovidiu Lazăr – Honvéd – 1992
 Filip Lăzăreanu – Nyíregyháza, Kecskemét  – 2007-10
 Cătălin Liță – MTK – 2003
 Cristian Luca - Sopron - 2005
 Marius Luca – Békéscsaba – 1995
 Ștefan Mardare – Debrecen – 2011
 Gheorghe Marginean – Debrecen – 1990–91
 Sorin Marginean – Haladás – 1999-00
 Adrian Mărkuș - Kaposvár - 2013
 Valentin Miculescu – Békéscsaba – 2003-05
 Darius Milcea – Pápa – 2005
 Mihai Mincă – Kisvárda – 2018-21
 Simion Mironaş – Békéscsaba – 1994
 Sergiu Moga – Honvéd – 2011-12
 Tibor Moldovan - Nyíregyháza, Újpest - 2007-08
 Levente Molnár - Győr, Honvéd, Sopron - 1997-04
 Cristian Munteanu – Sopron – 2005-07
 Dorel Mutică – Pápa – 2005
 Zsolt Muzsnay – Videoton – 1990-91; 1992–93; 1995
 Sándor Nagy - MTK, Diósgyőr, Nyíregyháza - 1993-94; 1997-01
 Mario Nedelea - Tiszakécske - 1998
 Eugen Neagoe – Vasas, Ferencváros – 1994-95
 Adrian Negrău – Honvéd, BVSC, Haladás – 1991-98
 Sergiu Negruț – Kisvárda – 2018-19
 Mihai Nicorec – Győr, Zalaegerszeg, Mezőkövesd – 2009-10; 2012–13; 2016
 Gheorghe Nițu – BVSC – 1995
 Dănuț Oprea – Győr – 1996
 Caruso Palacian - Csepel - 1993
 Raul Palmeș - Honvéd - 2016
 Claudiu Pascariu – Honvéd – 2013
 Florin Pelecaci – Diósgyőr – 2007-09
 Gheorghe Pena – Győr, Csepel, Honvéd – 1992-96
 Szabolcs Perenyi - Nyíregyháza - 2007-09
 Ion Petcu – Diósgyőr – 1991–92
 Andrei Peteleu - Kisvárda - 2021-
 Iulian Petrache – Kaposvár – 2013-14
 László Polgár - Videoton - 1991-92
 Marian Popa – BVSC – 1997
 Grigore Popan - Nyíregyháza - 2004
 Lucian Popescu – Győr – 1994-95
 Pavel Popovits - Gázszer, Pécs - 1999-00
 Florian Radu – Szentlőrinc – 1948
 Marius Radu - Sopron - 2006-07
 Sorin Radu – Diósgyőr – 1999-00
 Emil Raducu - Debrecen - 1993
 Florin Raducu – Békéscsaba – 1996–98
 Mircea Raican - Diósgyőr - 1999-00
 Daniel Rednic – MTK – 2002-04
 Ciprian Rosca - Stadler, Haladás - 1998-00
 Ion Roșu – Újpest – 1993
 Robert Roszel - Diósgyőr - 2010
 Adrián Rus – Balmazújváros, MOL Fehérvár – 2017-18; 2019–22
 Laurențiu Rus – FC Sopron – 2006-07
 Radu Sabo – Debrecen, Zalaegerszeg – 1998-05
 Claudiu Salagean – Győr, Sopron – 1996-02
 Marius Sasu – Honvéd, Ferencváros – 2001-05
 Marius Sava - Nyíregyháza - 2007
 Marian Savu – Videoton – 2003-04
 Toma Sedecaru – Nyíregyháza – 1992-93
 Tibor Selymes – Haladás, Debrecen – 2002–04
 Nicolae Simatoc – Nagyvárad – 1942-43
 Marius Siminic - Diósgyőr - 2005-06
 Viorel Stancu - Békéscsaba - 1995
 Constantin Stănici – BVSC – 1996-97
 Flavius Sterean - Haladás - 1999
 Florin Stoica - Békéscsaba - 1997-98
 Dan Stupar – Debrecen – 1996–98
 Alexandru Suciu – Siófok – 1992
 Marius Șumudică – Debrecen – 2002-03
 Anatolis Sundas - Honvéd - 2014
 Csaba Szántó - Győr, Sopron - 1990-94
 Béla Székely - Videoton - 1990
 Loránd Szilágyi - Honvéd - 2015-16
 Sándor Szűcs - Debrecen - 1989-91
 Nándor Tamás – Puskás Akadémia – 2019-20
 Ferenc Ternován - Diósgyőr - 1997-99
 Gyula Tikosi - MTK, Sopron, Csepel - 1994-96
 Dorel Toderas – Debrecen – 1990-91; 1994
 Árpád Tordai - MOL Fehérvár, Mezőkövesd - 2021-
 Daniel Tudor – Videoton – 2003–06
 Gheorghe Tulba – Debrecen – 1990
 Lucian Ulici - Békéscsaba - 1996
 Rémusz Unchiás - Békéscsaba - 1996
 Daniel Usvat – Haladás, BVSC, Videoton, Siófok, Pápa – 1996-99; 2000–04
 Nistor Văidean – Győr – 1990-91
 Viorel Vancea – Videoton, Honvéd, Békéscsaba, Vasas, BVSC – 1990-91; 1992–95
 Constantin Varga – Győr – 1994
 Ioan Varga – Újpest – 1991
 Adrian Văsâi – Nyíregyháza – 1992
 Szilárd Vereș - Gyirmót - 2017
 Sorin Vlaicu – Békéscsaba – 1994-95
 Gabriel Vochin – Videoton – 2003-04
 Ion Voicu – Fehérvár – 2003-05
 Ion Zare – Siófok, Pécs – 1990-94
 Ladislau Zilahi – Nagyvárad – 1943-46
 Ervin Zsiga – Balmazújváros, Kaposvár – 2017–18; 2019–20

Russia
 Guram Adzhoyev - Diósgyőr - 1992-93
 Aleksandr Alumona - Videoton - 2004-06
 Aleksandr Dozmorov - Vasas - 1990-92
 Vyacheslav Eremeev - Stadler, Dunaferr, Szeged, Tatabánya -1995-01
 Sergey Kuznetsov - Ferencváros - 1991-96
 Irakli Kvekveskiri - Pécs - 2012
 Valeriy Linnikov - Stadler - 1994-95
 Sergei Pervushin - Siófok - 1993
 Serder Serderov - Mezőkövesd - 2020-21
 Albert Tsarayev - Siófok - 1996-97
 Sandro Tsveiba – Újpest – 2014-15

Rwanda 

 Abass Rassou - Diósgyőr - 2007

Scotland 

 Mark Millar - Újpest - 2009-10

Senegal
 Bebeto - Kaposvár, Kecskemét, Gyirmót - 2012; 2014–15; 2017
 Mbaye Diagne - Újpest - 2015
 Issaga Diallo - Kaposvár - 2014
 Abass Dieng – Honvéd – 2007-12
 Matar Dieye - Debrecen - 2022-
 El Hadji Diouf - Haladás - 2010
 Christian Gomis - Honvéd - 2022-
 Mansour Kane - Honvéd - 1999
 Paul Keita - Mezőkövesd - 2017-18
 Jean Adrien Sagna - Vasas - 2008
 Lansana Sagna - Újpest - 2014
 Mouhamadou Seye – Pápa – 2012; 2015
 El Hadji Badiane Sidibé - Újpest - 2014
 Ibrahima Sidibe – Debrecen – 2005-08; 2012–16
 Souleymane Tandia - Honvéd - 2012-14
 Khaly Thiam - Kaposvár, MTK - 2012-16

Serbia
 Miloš Adamović - Vasas - 2015-16
 Aleksandar Alempijević – Kecskemét, Ferencváros – 2008-13
 Marko Anđić - Videoton - 2008-11
 Nemanja Andrić – Győr, Újpest, Balmazújváros - 2012-18
 Attila Andruskó - Kaposvár, Siófok - 2004-06; 2009
 Dragan Antanasijević - Kaposvár - 2010
 Filip Antonijević - MTK - 2021
 Nemanja Antonov - Újpest - 2020-
 Goran Arnaut - Vasas - 2010-11
 Nemanja Arsenijević - Honvéd - 2008-09
 Lazar Arsić – Vasas, Pápa – 2012-14
 Đorđe Babalj - Zalaegerszeg - 2007
 Djordje Bajic - BVSC - 1998-99
 Vojislav Bakrac - Tatabánya - 2006-07
 Marko Basara - Siófok - 2008-09
 Budimir Basic - Szeged - 1999
 Danilo Belić - Sopron - 2007
 Miroslav Bjeloš - Újpest - 2020-
 Igor Bogdanović - Debrecen, Honvéd, Győr, Nyíregyháza, Haladás - 2004-10
 Milan Bogunović - Zalaegerszeg, Diósgyőr, Pápa - 2006; 2009–12; 2014–15
 Saša Bogunović - Zalaegerszeg - 2006
 Mladen Brkić – Zalaegerszeg – 2012
 Dušan Brković – Debrecen, Diósgyőr – 2013-17; 2018–20
 Vladimir Buač - Eger - 2013
 Branislav Bulatovic - Nagykanizsa, Siófok - 1995-96
 Radoš Bulatović - Zalaegerszeg - 2011
 Vladimir Ciric - Diósgyőr - 2000
 Lazar Ćirković - Kisvárda, Budapest Honvéd - 2021-
 Milan Čokić - Siófok - 2012
 Nebojsa Corovic - Videoton - 1996
 Božidar Ćosić - Debrecen - 2009
 Dragan Crnomarkovic - Nagykanizsa, Ferencváros - 1999-00
 Vladan Čukić – Kecskemét, Ferencváros – 2008-09; 2010–17
 Dejan Cupic - Debrecen - 1997
 Slavko Damjanović - Békéscsaba - 2015-16
 Branislav Danilović – Puskás Akadémia, Videoton, Debrecen, Diósgyőr - 2014-21
 Milan Davidov - Zalaegerszeg, Nyíregyháza - 2007-08; 2010
 Stefan Deak - Siófok, Honvéd - 2012-13; 2017
 Srđan Dimitrov - MTK - 2020-22
 Petar Divić - Vasas - 2008-10
 Marko Dmitrović – Újpest – 2013-15
 Saša Dobrić - Vasas, Eger - 2008-10; 2012–13
 Dušan Đokić - Vác - 2007
 Goran Đorđevic - Újpest - 1995-96
 Vladimir Đorđević - Győr - 2009-14
 Marko Đorovic - Zalaegerszeg - 2005-06
 Aleksandar Djurasovic - BVSC - 1996
 Dejan Dražić - Honvéd - 2022
 Stefan Dražić - Mezőkövesd, Diósgyőr - 2018-19; 2020-
 Dragan Drljaca - Békéscsaba - 1994
 Jovan Drobnjak - Dunaferr, Honvéd, Békéscsaba - 2002-05
 Ivan Dudić - Zalaegerszeg, Újpest - 2007-10
 Josip Dulic - Videoton, Gázszer - 1996-99
 Zoran Đurišić - Debrecen, Videoton - 1997-98
 Emir Džinović - BVSC - 1993-94
 Daniel Farkaš - Mezőkövesd - 2017-22
 Nenad Filipović - Videoton, MTK - 2009-10
 Vladan Filipovic - Békéscsaba, Videoton, Diósgyőr - 1995-96; 1999-00
 Ivica Francišković - Zalaegerszeg - 2005-07
 Željko Gavrić - Ferencváros - 2021-
 Dejan Georgijević - Ferencváros - 2018
 Petar Gigić - Újpest - 2020
 Dragan Gošić - Szolnok - 2011
 Goran Grkinić - Kecskemét - 2008-09
 Nikola Grubješić - Dunaújváros - 2015
 Duško Grujić - Békéscsaba - 2002-05
 Miroslav Grumić – Kaposvár, Pécs, Diósgyőr, Haladás, Zalaegerszeg  – 2011-16; 2017–19 
 Aleksandar Ignjatović - Honvéd - 2012-16 
 Brana Ilić - Kisvárda - 2018-19 
 Stevan Jakoba - Haladás - 1999 
 Milos Janic - Békéscsaba, Nyíregyháza - 1997-98 
 Ivan Janjic - MTK, Zalaegerszeg, Vasas - 2003-06 
 Radivoje Jevdjovic - Pécs - 2006 
 Goran Jevtić - Debrecen - 1997 
 Goran Jezdimirović - MTK, Tatabánya - 2000-06 
 Đorđe Jocić - Pécs - 2013-14 
 Miloš Jokić - Szolnok, Vasas - 2011-12 
 Dejan Joksimović - Haladás - 1999 
 Aleksandar Jovanović - Ferencváros, Debrecen - 2011-19 
 Goran Jovanović - Győr - 2002-03 
 Mirko Jovanović - Honvéd, Haladás - 1995-99 
 Aleksandar Jović – Ferencváros - 2001-03
 Dejan Karan – Kecskemét, Diósgyőr – 2013-15; 2016–21
 Miloš Kocić - Győr - 2015
 Miloš Kolaković - Debrecen - 2005
 Goran Kolaric - Pécs - 2000
 Miso Koljenovic - MTK - 2006
 Goran Kopunović - Ferencváros, Újpest - 1994-96; 1998-00
 Velibor Kopunović - Vác, Újpest - 1998-99; 2007
 Jevrem Kosnić - Honvéd - 2014-15
 Srdjan Kostic - Haladás - 1999
 Zoran Kostić - Diósgyőr, Nyíregyháza - 2013-15
 Željko Kovačević - Nyíregyháza - 2010
 Miloš Krstić - Diósgyőr - 2015
 Zoltan Kujundzic - Videoton - 1996
 Zoran Kuntić - Videoton, Ferencváros, Vasas - 1995-96; 1997–98
 Ognjen Lakić - Siófok - 2007
 Mladen Lambulić - MTK, Sopron, Újpest, Kecskemét - 2002-10
 Bojan Lazić - MTK, Sopron, Ferencváros - 2001-06
 Danko Lazović – Videoton – 2016-18
 Ognjen Lekić - Sopron - 2006
 Matija Ljujić - Újpest - 2022-
 Nenad Lukić - Honvéd - 2021-
 Novica Maksimović - Pápa - 2013
 Bojan Mamić – Ferencváros – 2009–10
 Goran Marić - Pápa - 2010-14
 Radovan Maric – Vasas – 1988
 Dejan Marinkovic - Nagykanizsa - 1999
 Lazar Marjanović – Diósgyőr – 2014-15
 Miljan Markovic - Szeged - 1999
 Nenad Markovic - Szeged - 1999
 Radovan Markovic - Győr - 1999-00
 Sasa Markovic - Nyíregyháza - 1999
 Saša Marković - MTK - 2002
 Slobodan Markovic - Kaposvár - 2009
 Vanja Marković - Kaposvár - 2019
 Marko Marović - Pécs - 2011-12
 Momcilo Medic – Veszprém – 1989
 Branko Mihajlović - Diósgyőr - 2018-20
 Dušan Mileusnić - Vasas - 2010-12
 Boris Miličić - Diósgyőr, Szolnok - 2008-11
 Zoran Milinković - Honvéd - 1994
 Dejan Milovanović - Ferencváros, Dunaferr - 1995-99
 Luka Milunović - Debrecen - 2020
 Vuk Mitošević - Kisvárda - 2018
 Nikola Mitrović – Újpest, Videoton, Zalaegerszeg, Honvéd – 2010-13; 2019-
 Djordje Mrdjanin - Vasas - 2009
 Petar Mudreša - Kaposvár - 2011-12
 Bojan Neziri - Győr - 2007
 Đorđe Nikolić - Újpest - 2022-
 Marko Nikolić - Budafok, Debrecen - 2020-22
 Nenad Nikolić - Vasas - 2008-09
 Uroš Nikolić – Videoton, Puskás Akadémia – 2012-13
 Nenad Novaković – Debrecen – 2011-16
 Nemanja Obradović - Kisvárda - 2020
 Nemanja Obrić - Kaposvár, Haladás - 2008-10
 Dražen Okuka - Kaposvár, Diósgyőr, MTK - 2010-17
 Filip Pajović - Videoton, Puskás Akadémia, Újpest - 2015-16; 2017-
 Tomislav Pajović - Vasas - 2015
 Dušan Pantelić - Honvéd - 2021-22
 Aleksandar Pantic - Siófok, Videoton - 2002-04
 Danilo Pantić - MOL Fehérvár - 2019
 Đorđe Pantić - Debrecen - 2009
 Ognjen Paripovic - Vasas - 2008-09
 Branko Pauljević – Pécs, Puskás Akadémia, Mezőkövesd, Újpest - 2015-
Čedomir Pavičević - Pécs, Vasas, Eger - 2003-11; 2012–13
Dušan Pavlov - Eger - 2012-13
Bojan Pavlović - Kaposvár - 2010-14
Danilo Pejovic - Kecskemét - 2022-
 Milan Perić – Kaposvár, Videoton, Ferencváros, Pécs, Dunaújváros – 2010-14
 Marko Petković - Honvéd - 2022
 Vladimir Petric - Videoton - 1999
 Stojan Pilipović - Kecskemét - 2014
 Predrag Počuča - Sopron - 2007
 Saša Popin - Pápa, Haladás - 2014-16
 Igor Popović - Siófok - 2008
 Ivan Popović - Újpest - 2005
 Nenad Pozder - Diósgyőr - 1999-00
 Josip Projić - Honvéd - 2015
 Radoš Protić - Kisvárda - 2018-20
 Antal Puhalak - Honvéd, Videoton - 1994-95 
 Bratislav Punoševac - Honvéd, Békéscsaba - 2015-16
 Dragan Puskas - Csepel, Békéscsaba, Gázszer, Videoton, Pécs - 1994-98; 2000
 Siniša Radanović - Kecskemét - 2011
 Zsolt Radics - Kaposvár - 2006
 Stefan Radoja - Kecskemét - 2015
 Aleksandar Radosavljević - Győr - 2010-11
 Zoran Radulovic - Vasas - 2007
 Nenad Rajić – Diósgyőr – 2013-15
 Slobodan Rajković - MTK - 2022
 Savo Raković - Diósgyőr, Eger - 2011-13
 Aleksandar Ranđelović - Pápa - 2015
 Ivan Ristić - Videoton - 2002-04
 Radojica Ristic - Kecskemét - 2009
 Emil Rockov - MOL Fehérvár - 2020-
 Vladan Savić - Kecskemét - 2008-15
 Marko Šćepović - Videoton - 2016-19
 Stefan Šćepović - Videoton - 2018-19
 Danilo Sekulić – Debrecen – 2016-17
 Djordje Simic - Diósgyőr - 2009
 Dušan Šimić - Békéscsaba - 2004-05
 Slobodan Simović - Kisvárda - 2020-
 Nebojša Skopljak - Kecskemét - 2015
 Darko Spalević - Zalaegerszeg - 2005
 Bojan Spasojević - Zalaegerszeg - 2005
 Mirsad Sprecak – Videoton, Siófok, Veszprém – 1989-91; 1993
 Dejan Srdic - Debrecen - 1996
 Zoran Stamenić - Honvéd - 2004
 Srđan Stanić - Diósgyőr, Kaposvár, Ferencváros - 2008-11
 Aleksandar Stanisavljević - Zalaegerszeg - 2011
 Filip Stanisavljević – Újpest – 2012-15
 Lazar Stanišić - Győr - 2009-15
 Saša Stevanović - Győr - 2004-14
 Nenad Stojaković - Honvéd - 2008-09
 Aleksandar Stoimirović - Pécs - 2012
 Zoran Šupić - Győr, Diósgyőr, Pápa - 2007-11; 2013
 Aleksandar Tanasin - Zalaegerszeg - 2020-21
 Mirko Tintar – Videoton – 1989-90
 Mirko Todorovic - Békéscsaba - 1996-97
 Nenad Todorović - Zalaegerszeg, Pécs - 2009-10; 2011–12
 Nikola Trajković - Győr - 2010-15
 Dane Trbović - Diósgyőr - 2008
 Bojan Trkulja - Sopron - 2006
 Milutin Trnavac - Zalaegerszeg - 2008
 Aleksandar Trninić - Debrecen - 2013
 Nikola Trujić - Debrecen - 2019-20
 Djordje Tutoric – Ferencváros - 2010-11
 Vojo Ubiparip - Vasas - 2015
 Dušan Vasiljević – Békéscsaba, Kaposvár, Újpest, Videoton, Honvéd – 2004–07; 2010–17
 Ljubisa Vasiljevic - Veszprém, Vasas - 1993-94
 Lazar Veselinović - Mezőkövesd - 2017 
 Boris Vidakovic - Tiszakécske - 1997-98 
 Nebojša Vignjević - Tatabánya - 2001 
 Dejan Vilotic - Videoton, Békéscsaba - 2000-05 
 Despot Višković - Diósgyőr - 2007 
 Đorđe Vlajić - Győr - 2004 
 Draško Vojinović - Diósgyőr, Nyíregyháza - 2008-10 
 Miloš Vranjanin - Kisvárda - 2022- 
 Mićo Vranješ - Pécs - 2004 
 Goran Vujic - Pécs - 2006 
 Dejan Vukadinović - Nyíregyháza, Diósgyőr, MTK - 2007-08; 2009–11 
 Milonja Vukadinovic - Haladás - 1994 
 Ljubiša Vukelja - Vasas - 2009 
Dragan Vukmir – Ferencváros, Debrecen, Honvéd, MTK – 2002–08; 2009–17
Branislav Vukomanović – Szolnok – 2011
Boris Živanović - Honvéd, Nyíregyháza - 2012-14
Lazar Zličić - Kisvárda - 2020-22

Sierra Leone
 Alfi Conteh-Lacalle – Nyíregyháza, Honvéd - 2010

Slovakia
 Robert Barborik - Pécs - 1993
 Miroslav Bedi - Siófok - 1999-00
 László Bénes - Győr - 2014
 Mário Bicák - Győr - 2008-09
 Martin Bielik - Vasas - 2008
 Jakub Brašeň - Mezőkövesd - 2017-18
 Roman Bujdák - Pécs - 1995-96
 Jaroslav Cellár - Győr - 2015
 Martin Chrien - Mezőkövesd - 2021-22
 Erik Čikoš - Debrecen - 2018-19
 Ondrej Daňko - Csepel - 1995
 Ondrej Debnár - Sopron - 2004
 Juraj Dovičovič - Zalaegerszeg - 2007
 Pavol Ďurica - Videoton - 2008
 Peter Fieber - Honvéd - 2011
 Branislav Fodrek - Haladás - 2010-11
 Jozef Gašpar - Diósgyőr, Vasas - 2005; 2009–11
 András Gasparik - Vác - 2000
 Gergely Geri - Nyíregyháza - 2005
 Árpád Gögh - Győr, Gázszer - 1997-99; 2002
 Marián Had - Győr - 2013-14
 Ľuboš Hajdúch - Kaposvár, Puskás Akadémia - 2011-15
 Juraj Halenár - Nyíregyháza - 2015
 Michal Hanek – Diósgyőr – 2012-14
 Zoltán Harsányi - Pécs, Mezőkövesd, Puskás Akadémia, Balmazújváros - 2012-15; 2018
 Marcel Horký - Honvéd - 2004
 Dávid Hudák – Újpest, Mezőkövesd – 2015; 2016–18
 Luboš Ilizi - Vasas, Békéscsaba - 2011-12; 2015
 Martin Juhar - Diósgyőr - 2018-19
 Andrej Kadlec - MTK - 2022
 Ľuboš Kamenár - Győr, Vasas - 2013-15; 2017–18
 Petr Kašpar - Újpest - 1991-92
 Attila Király - Vác - 2000
 Vojtech Kiss - Tatabánya - 2001
 Kristián Kolčák - Gyirmót, Haladás - 2017-19
 Kamil Kopúnek - Haladás - 2014
 Tomáš Košický - Debrecen - 2018-20; 2021-
 Marek Kostoláni - Honvéd - 2011
 Tomáš Košút - Honvéd - 2018
 Miroslav Kozák - Tatabánya - 2007
 Ladislav Kozmér - Zalaegerszeg, Kaposvár - 2004-06
 Radoslav Kráľ - Zalaegerszeg - 2002-04
 Richard Križan - Puskás Akadémia - 2019
 František Kunzo - Diósgyőr, Újpest, Videoton, Vác - 1999-03; 2006
 Mátyás Lelkes - Kaposvár - 2010
 András Lénárt - Győr - 2015
 Martin Lipčák - Zalaegerszeg - 2007
 Viliam Macko - Honvéd - 2009-10
 Tomáš Majtán - Mezőkövesd - 2017-18
 Róbert Mak - Ferencváros - 2020-22
 Péter Medgyes - Pécs, Csepel - 1991-96
 Tomáš Medveď - Videoton, Pápa - 2003-05
 Alexander Mészáros - Csepel - 1996-97
 Karol Mészáros – Puskás Akadémia, Debrecen, Haladás, Újpest – 2016-19
 Attila Miklós - Videoton - 1997-98
 Péter Mikóczi - Haladás - 1995-96
 Patrik Mišák - Mezőkövesd - 2018
 Juraj Molnár - Vác - 1993
 Péter Molnár - Győr, Siófok, Paks - 2009-11; 2013–17
 Jozef Muzlay - Sopron - 2004
 Krisztián Németh - Tatabánya - 2005
 Július Nôta - Diósgyőr, Zalaegerszeg, Honvéd, Vasas - 1997-02
 Ján Novota - Debrecen - 2017
 Milan Pastva - Tatabánya, Honvéd - 2007; 2009
 Matúš Paukner - Békéscsaba - 2016
 Marek Penksa - Ferencváros - 2002-05
 Róbert Pillár - Mezőkövesd - 2017-
 Attila Pinte - Ferencváros - 2000-02
 Patrik Pinte - Haladás - 2017-18
 Peter Polgár - Zalaegerszeg - 2007-08
 Peter Pokorný - MOL Fehérvár - 2022-
 Marian Postrk - Tatabánya - 2006-07
 Roland Praj - Újpest - 1993-95
 Dávid Radványi - Vasas - 2011
 Róbert Rák - Diósgyőr - 1997
 Richárd Rubint - Békéscsaba, Diósgyőr - 2004; 2006–07
 Ladislav Rybánsky - Kecskemét, Siófok, Diósgyőr - 2010-13
 Kornel Saláta - Haladás - 2019
 Attila Sánta - Siófok - 2000
 Jakub Sedláček - Újpest - 2020
 Tomáš Sedlák - Kaposvár - 2012
 Stanislav Šesták - Ferencváros - 2015-16
 Vladimir Siago - Vác - 1995-96
 Branislav Sluka - MTK - 2022
 Marián Sluka - Zalaegerszeg, Siófok, Haladás, Pápa - 2008-12; 2014–15
 Michal Škvarka - Ferencváros - 2019-21
 Zoltán Sováb - Vác - 2000
 Simeon Stevica - Pápa - 2004-06
 Peter Struhár - Nyíregyháza, Pápa - 2010; 2013–14
 Peter Šulek - Mezőkövesd - 2017
 Martin Svintek - Vác - 2006
 Otto Szabó - MTK, Sopron, Debrecen, Vasas, Győr, Pápa - 2003-06; 2009–13
 Ákos Szarka – Diósgyőr, Gyirmót – 2017-18
 János Szépe - Zalaegerszeg, Mezőkövesd, MTK - 2019-22
 Marian Timko - Diósgyőr - 2000
 Rudolf Urban - Győr - 2007
 Jozef Urblík - Puskás Akadémia - 2018-
 Stanislav Velický - Mezőkövesd - 2014
 Denis Ventúra - Gyirmót - 2022
 Róbert Vittek - Debrecen - 2016
 Ján Vlasko - Puskás Akadémia - 2018-20
 Jakub Vojtuš - Mezőkövesd - 2020-21
 Robert Weber - Győr - 1994
 Igor Žofčák - Nyíregyháza - 2015

Slovenia
 Jože Benko – Pápa – 2012
 Klemen Bingo - Zalaegerszeg - 2006
 Miha Blažič – Ferencváros – 2017–22
 Darko Brljak – Eger – 2012-13
 Gregor Bunc - Zalaegerszeg - 1999-00
 Timotej Dodlek - Dunaújváros - 2014-15
 Safet Jahič – Zalaegerszeg, Kaposvár, Dunaújváros – 2011-12; 2014–15
 Adem Kapič – Ferencváros, Vasas - 2001-06
 Denis Klinar - Puskás Akadémia - 2018
 Aleš Kokot - Kecskemét - 2010
 Rok Kronaveter – Győr – 2012-14
 Rene Mihelič - Debrecen - 2014-15
 Matej Miljatovic - Zalaegerszeg - 2007-10
 Stanislav Sestak – Ferencváros – 2016–17
 Leon Panikvar – Zalaegerszeg, Pécs – 2009-12
 Damir Pekič - Zalaegerszeg - 2007-09
 Matej Poplatnik - Kaposvár - 2019
 Milan Rakič - Kecskemét - 2009
 Marko Ranilović – Ferencváros, Kaposvár – 2010-14
 Admir Suljic - Kaposvár - 2006-08
 Dejan Trajkovski - Puskás Akadémia - 2018-19
 Uroš Veselič - Kecskemét - 2009-10
 Dalibor Volaš - Debrecen - 2013-15
 Zoran Zeljković - Pécs - 2011-13
 Žiga Živko - Zalaegerszeg - 2020

Somalia
 Ayub Daud – Honvéd – 2013-15

South Africa 

 Johnson Naeem - III. Kerület - 1998
 MacBeth Sibaya - III. Kerület - 1998
 Lafe Vittitoe - III. Kerület - 1998

South Korea
 Kim Ho-Young – Diósgyőr – 2014-15
 Lee Do-kweon - Újpest - 2007
 Ryu Seung-woo – Ferencváros – 2016-17
 Suk Hyun-jun - Debrecen - 2017

Spain
 Carlos Alcántara – Ferencváros – 2009–10
 Chema Antón – Újpest – 2012-14
 Álvaro Brachi – Videoton – 2011-15
 Juan Calatayud - Videoton - 2013-15
 Ezequiel Calvente – Békéscsaba, Haladás, Debrecen – 2015–18
 Enrique Carreño – Diósgyőr – 2011
 Pablo Coira - Honvéd - 2010
 Fernando Cuerda - Honvéd - 2010
 Walter Fernández – Videoton – 2011–-13
 Fernando – Diósgyőr – 2012-13
 Francisco Gallardo – Diósgyőr, Puskás Akadémia – 2011-14
 Manu Hervás – Zalaegerszeg – 2011-12
 Juanan - Újpest - 2013-14
 José Luque – Diósgyőr – 2011-13
 Miguel Ángel Luque - Puskás Akadémia - 2012-14
 Christian Manrique - Debrecen - 2022-
 Héctor Martínez - Mezőkövesd - 2021-22
 David Mateos – Ferencváros – 2013-15
 Bruno Pascua - Dunaújváros - 2014-15
 Joaquín Pastor – Ferencváros – 2009–10
Cristian Portilla – Honvéd – 2014
 Nono – Diósgyőr – 2016-18; 2021
 Daniel Orozco - Pápa - 2013
 Dani Ponce – Újpest – 2014
 Rufino - Honvéd - 2010-11
 Jairo Samperio - Honvéd - 2022-
 Héctor Sánchez – Videoton – 2011-13
 Sergio Tamayo – MTK – 2014-15
 Diego Vela  – Diósgyőr – 2016-18

Sudan
 Ibrahim Komi - Diósgyőr - 1999

Sweden
 Kristian Benkő - Pápa - 2014
 Bojan Djordjic - Videoton - 2010-11
 Jack Lahne - Újpest - 2022-
 Adrian Oprisan - Stadler, MTK - 1994-96
 Anton Salétros - Újpest - 2017

Switzerland 

 Arnaud Bühler - Haladás - 2015
 Alessandro Iandoli - Újpest - 2012-13
 Mihael Kovačević - Nyíregyháza - 2015
 Zenun Selimi - Ferencváros - 1998-99
 Haris Tabaković - Debrecen, Diósgyőr - 2017-20

Syria 

 Ammar Ramadan - Ferencváros - 2020

Tajikistan 

 Oleg Shirinbekov - Vasas - 1991-94

Togo 

 Euloge Ahodikpe - Diósgyőr, Pápa - 2008-09; 2015
 Henritse Eninful - Újpest, Kecskemét - 2012-15
 Kassim Guyazou - Diósgyőr - 2008
 Francis Koné - Honvéd - 2015

Trinidad and Tobago
 Akeem Adams – Ferencváros – 2013 1
 Densill Theobald - Újpest - 2007

Tunisia 

 Änis Ben-Hatira – Honvéd – 2019
 Aïssa Laïdouni - Ferencváros - 2020-
 Helmi Loussaief - Vasas - 2010

Turkey
Mahir Saglik – Vasas – 2016-17

Uganda 

 Martin Mutumba - Videoton - 2010

Ukraine
 Oleksiy Antonov – Gyirmót – 2017
 Denys Bezborodko - Gyirmót - 2022
 Ivan Bobko – Debrecen – 2016
 Oleksandr Bondarenko - BVSC - 1994-99
 Andriy Boryachuk - Mezőkövesd - 2020
 Viktor Brovchenko - BVSC - 1998
 Valeriy Cap - Nyíregyháza - 1998
 Sergey Chaban - Pécs, Győr - 1993-96
 Ruslan Chernienko - Nyíregyháza, Videoton - 1999-01
 Vyacheslav Churko – Puskás Akadémia, Mezőkövesd – 2016; 2022
 Mykhaylo Denysov - Videoton - 2008
 Andriy Efremov – Szombathely – 2014–2015
 Artem Favorov - Puskás Akadémia, Zalaegerszeg - 2020-
 Yaroslav Gelesh - Kisvárda - 2022-
 Anatoliy Grytsayuk - Békéscsaba, Vasas - 1992-99
 Yuriy Habovda - Balmazújváros, Haladás, Debrecen - 2017-20
 Viktor Hey - Kisvárda - 2018-
 Sergey Hleba - Stadler - 1994-95; 1997–98
 Oleh Holodyuk - Haladás, Zalaegerszeg - 2019
Viktor Hrachov - Debrecen, BVSC - 1990-94
Danylo Ihnatenko – Ferencváros – 2019
Igor Juskevic - Stadler - 1996-97
Roman Karasyuk - Kisvárda - 2018-21
 Ihor Kharatin – Ferencváros – 2019-21
 Vasyl Khimich - Kisvárda - 2020-
Yuriy Kolomoyets – MTK – 2017
Anton Kravchenko - Kisvárda - 2019-
Vladyslav Kulach – Honvéd – 2019
 Serhiy Kuznetsov – Ferencváros – 2001–2002
 Artem Kychak - MTK - 2018-19
 Bogdan Lednev - MOL Fehérvár - 2022-
 Pavlo Lukyanchuk - Kisvárda - 2018-19
 Dmytro Lyopa – Puskás Akadémia – 2016
 Yevhenii Makarenko - MOL Fehérvár - 2021-
 Vyacheslav Medvid - Debrecen, Gázszer - 1993-99
 Bohdan Melnyk - Kisvárda - 2018-
 Mykhaylo Meskhi - Mezőkövesd, Kecskemét - 2018-21; 2022-
 Artem Milevskyi - Kisvárda - 2018
 Viktor Mokrytskyi - Stadler, Videoton, Gázszer - 1994-95; 1997–99
 Serhiy N. Morozov - MTK - 1991-92
 Oleg Mozgovoy - Dunaferr - 1999-00
 Oleksandr Nad – Honvéd, Gyirmót, Debrecen – 2016-21
 Viktor Natorov - MTK - 1998
 Andriy Nesterov - Mezőkövesd - 2019-21
 Ihor Nichenko – Stadler, Ferencváros, Dunaferr, Győr - 1995-04
 Oleksandr Nikiforov - BVSC, MTK - 1991-92; 1995–96 
 Artem Odintsov - Kisvárda - 2020- 
 Volodymyr Ovsienko – Nyíregyháza - 2010; 2014–15
 Volodymyr Parkhomenko - Diósgyőr - 1991-92
 Temur Partsvania - Kisvárda - 2018
 Yevhen Pavlov – Vasas – 2015-18
 Oleksandr Petrusenko - Honvéd - 2022
 Ivan Petryak – Ferencváros, Fehérvár – 2018-22
 Vyacheslav Polulyakh - Stadler - 1996-97
 Maksym Pukhtieiev - Honvéd - 2022-
 Vasyl Rats – Ferencváros – 1991–92
 Denys Rebryk - Vasas, Pápa, Siófok - 2007; 2009–11
 Myroslav Reshko - Stadler, BVSC - 1995-98
 Viktor Riznychenko - Kisvárda - 2020
 Oleksandr Romanchuk - Debrecen - 2022-
 Danylo Ryabenko - Mezőkövesd - 2020-
 Mykhaylo Ryashko - Kisvárda, Kecskemét - 2018-19; 2022-
 Oleksandr Safronov - Zalaegerszeg - 2022-
 Yevhen Selin - MTK - 2018-19
 Yuriy Selikhov - Stadler - 1996
 Artem Shabanov - MOL Fehérvár - 2022-
 Serhiy Shestakov - Diósgyőr - 2018-21
 Oleksiy Shvedyuk - Békéscsaba - 2016
 Yuriy Shevel - Nyíregyháza - 2008
 Serhiy Shubin - Diósgyőri VTK - 1993
 Anton Shynder - Kisvárda - 2018
 Vyacheslav Skunc - Nyíregyháza, Haladás - 1992; 1995
 Oleg Slobodskiy - Siófok - 1997-98
 Serhiy Svystun - Diósgyőr - 1991-93
 Oleg Sych - Haladás - 1992; 1994
 Volodymyr Tanchyk – Gyirmót – 2017
 Oleksandr Tkachuk - Videoton - 2009
 Roman Tolochko - Pécs - 1993-96
 Yuriy Ushmaev - Békéscsaba - 1992-95
 Vladimir Vachilya - Stadler - 1996-97
 Andriy Yakymiv - Kaposvár - 2019-20
 Pavlo Yanchuk – Honvéd – 2010
 Kyrylo Yanitskyi - Puskás Akadémia - 2021-
 Andriy Yefremov - Haladás - 2014
Oleksandr Zubkov – Ferencváros – 2019-22

United States
Ryan Caugherty - Tatabánya - 2007
Eduvie Ikoba – Zalaegerszeg – 2019-20; 2022-
 Christopher Sullivan – Győr – 1990; 1996–97
 Peter Vermes – Győr – 1988-89
 Henry Wingo - Ferencváros - 2021-
 Eric McWoods - Zalaegerszeg - 2020

Uruguay
 Washington Aires - Vasas - 1990-92
 Pablo Caballero - Vasas - 2010
 Fernando Gorriarán – Ferencváros – 2017–19
 Rodrigo Rojo – Újpest – 2014-15
 Gonzalo Vega - Puskás Akadémia - 2018-19

Venezuela
 Frank Feltscher – Debrecen – 2017
Jesús Meza – Honvéd – 2015

Zambia
 Misheck Lungu – Pápa, Honvéd - 2006; 2009
 Lloyd Mumba - Pápa - 2006

Notes
Note 1: suffered heart attack after Ferencvárosi TC–Újpest FC derby on 27 September 2013 and died 30 December 2013.

References

 List of all foreign players with appearances at NB I at nela.hu
 Player Database
 World Football

 
 
Hungary
Association football player non-biographical articles